Presidente Pedro Aguirre Cerda is an underground metro station on the Line 6 of the Santiago Metro, in Santiago, Chile. This station is named for the name of the commune and the president of Chile of the same name who governed between 1938 and 1941. The station was opened on 2 November 2017 as part of the inaugural section of the line, between Cerrillos and Los Leones.

References

Santiago Metro stations
Santiago Metro Line 6